Terrence Duffy or Terence Duffy could refer to: 

Terrence A. Duffy, American businessman
Terry Duffy (1922–1985), British labor leader